Tiny Town or Tinytown may refer to:

Tiny Town (miniature park), Springfield, Missouri
Tiny Town (amusement park), Morrison, Colorado
Tiny Town, Kentucky, an unincorporated community in Todd County
Tinytown, Virginia, an unincorporated community in Pulaski County
Tiny Town (band), an American rock-blues band

See also
The Terror of Tiny Town